Salicyluric acid is the glycine conjugate of salicylic acid and is the primary form in which salicylates are excreted from the body, via the kidneys. The pathway is very similar to the pathway of benzoic acid excretion as hippuric acid.

References 

Salicylamides
Amino acid derivatives
Human metabolites